Tranovalto is a village and a community in the Kozani regional unit, Greece. It was the seat of the Kamvounia municipality. The postal code is 50500, and the population was 790 in 2011. Είναι το χωριό του Στέργιου  

The monastery Moni Stanou is nearby.

References

Populated places in Kozani (regional unit)